The B1145 runs for about  through the county of Norfolk, England, between King’s Lynn and Mundesley. The road is an alternative route to the A47 between King's Lynn and Norwich by way of the A1067 from Bawdeswell onwards.

History
This ancient route predates the Norman Conquest and remained the main east–west route through the county until the 17th century. It can be seen quiet clearly on William Faden’s map of Norfolk, which was surveyed between 1790 and 1794. This map, the first large-scale map (at one inch to the mile) of the whole county, is a record of the landscape and transport system of the county of Norfolk in late 18th century and shows that despite the Parliamentary Enclosure of the early 19th century the route has changed very little. Much of the route on the map is highlighted in a pale pink, which marks it out as an important artery of the time.

The route is dissected by several Roman roads, including the Peddars Way in the North West of Norfolk.

Road schemes at Bawdeswell, Aylsham and North Walsham have created interruptions to the original route, although the vast majority of it remains intact.

Coaching route
The B1145 also was part of the King's Lynn–to–Great Yarmouth coaching route. On the route at Litcham stands The Bull Inn, a 17th-century coaching inn of which some parts date further back to the 14th century. The Bull provided the first change of horses on this coaching route out of King’s Lynn.

Destinations
From west to east the road passes through:
Bawsey
Ashwicken
Gayton
Litcham
Mileham
Brisley
North Elmham
Billingford
Bawdeswell
Pettywell
Reepham
Cawston
Aylsham
Felmingham
North Walsham
Swafield
Knapton
Mundesley

References

Roads in England
Transport in Norfolk